Parliamentary elections were held in Nauru on 3 May 2003 to elect members of the Parliament of Nauru. The election took place with Nauru having economic difficulties and a large budget deficit. This was the main issue in the election, which followed a period where a number of presidents had been elected for short periods of time. However the election resulted in deadlock for several weeks afterwards, with parliament divided between three candidates for president. It was only at the end of May that Ludwig Scotty was elected as the new president of Nauru and was able to form a new government.

Background
Under the constitution of Nauru the 18 members of parliament are elected at least every 3 years from 8 constituencies. Voters rank the candidates with the top 2 candidates being elected from 7 constituencies and 4 being elected from the 8th constituency. The President of Nauru is elected by the members of parliament from among themselves and can be removed by a majority vote in parliament.

Following the last election in 2000 Bernard Dowiyogo was elected president after the then president René Harris resigned. However Dowiyogo was defeated in a motion of non-confidence in April 2001 and Harris became president again. Harris served until 2003, but with the budget deficit increasing to almost half of Nauru's gross domestic product by 2002 and many government workers having not been paid in months, he was ousted after an extended deadlock in parliament in January 2003. Dowiyogo became president once more and served until his death in the United States in March 2003. Derog Gioura then became acting president until elections could be held in May.

Campaign
Major issues in the election included corruption and the mismanagement of the finances of Nauru, combined with declining incomes from the mining of phosphate. This had led the Asian Development Bank to state that Nauru's economy was in big trouble, with many public sector workers receiving their first pay in months on the day before the election. Another issue in the election was the detention centres set up in Nauru for people seeking asylum in Australia.

During the campaign for the election in which just under 4,500 people were eligible voters, the education minister Anthony Audoa called on Australia and New Zealand to run the election, as he claimed that his country would be unable to conduct a free and fair election. However President Gioura said Audoa had no authority to make that call and said that Nauru did not need any help in running the election. Audoa had had responsibility for the Nauru Phosphate Royalties Trust removed by President Gioura and the two men had fallen out as a result.

Results
The results saw 6 new members of parliament elected, with the remaining 12 retaining their seats. 15 of those elected were not members of any party, while the Nauru First party had the other 3 members. Among the new members were 2 of the Nauru First party and the Commonwealth Games gold medallist Marcus Stephen. While 5 sitting members lost seats including the education minister Anthony Audoa; the president Derog Gioura and the former presidents Kinza Clodumar and Rene Harris were re-elected.

Presidential election

Following the election Parliament met to elect a new president but was unable to reach agreement. Godfrey Thoma was initially elected speaker but resigned the following day as the speaker initially did not get a vote in the presidential election. With parliament evenly split between supporters of former president Kinza Clodumar, Nauru First member David Adeang and Ludwig Scotty, nobody was then willing to be elected speaker. The deadlock continued for several weeks with calls for new elections to break the stalemate.

However towards the end of May the impasse was broken when 2 of the 3 factions reached agreement. As a result, Nauru First member Fabian Ribauw was elected speaker and in return Ludwig Scotty was able to get enough support to become president. Scotty was elected president by 10 votes to 7 for Kinza Clodumar.

References

External links
Constituency results

Elections in Nauru
Nauru
2003 in Nauru
Election and referendum articles with incomplete results